Malaquías Montoya is an American born Chicano poster artist and a major figure in the Chicano Art Movement of the 1960s and 1970s.

Early life and teaching
Montoya was born in Albuquerque, New Mexico. He was raised by a single mother in a family of migrant farm workers (including brother, José Montoya) in California's Central Valley.  He joined the U.S. Marines and through the G.I. Bill was able to attend the University of California at Berkeley.  In 1968, Montoya founded the Mexican-American Liberation Art Front and was "arguably the most influential Chicano artist collective in the movement".

Since then he has taught at University of California, Berkeley, Stanford University, California College of Arts and Crafts, University of Notre Dame, and University of Texas, San Antonio. Since 1989 Montoya has held a professorship at the University of California, Davis, teaching both in the department of Art and the department of Chicana/o Studies.

Art works

Montoya is known for incorporating social justice themes in his work.  In 2006 he completed a series of paintings and screenprints on the death penalty which referenced those killed by the death penalty from Ethel and Julius Rosenberg, to Jesus Christ.  Other themes include immigration, the zapatista movement, Palestine, and others.

Montoya has produced substantial work on the issue of immigration. He produced the print “Immigrant’s Dream (2004)” which shows a faceless figure covered completely in the American flag with serves as a bag with a tag labeled “undocumented.” This print presented the horrific reality of what becomes of the coveted American Dream. Another print titled, “Undocumented” includes a man trapped in barbed wire with the word undocumented written in red with blood dripping across his body. The barbed wire is representative of the physical barrier of the US Mexico Border migrants encounter when crossing the border. In addition the captivity of the man within the barbed wire is metaphorical for the emotional suffering due to migration. Montoya’s art is evident of social justice themes that expose the realities of marginalized communities that can make people uncomfortable.

Activism 
Montoya’s activism was shaped by his exposure to the Chicano movement which incorporated ideals of resistance and cultural affirmation. This movement had an emphasis on civil rights for Mexican Americans and raising political, economic, and social consciousness. He became part of the Mexican American Student Confederation (MASC) and produced leaflets and posters to empower the community and raise awareness about the cause. He demonstrated solidarity with fellow activists by distributing UFW buttons and bumper stickers. Moreover, he participated in MASC sit ins which were organized to demand University of California, Berkeley to include a Mexican American Studies course of study and requested that the administration demonstrate solidarity with the UFW’s grape boycott.

At Berkeley, Montoya was actively involved with advocacy organizations by contributing art to their mobilization efforts. He continued his poster making collaboration with the UFW in Berkeley. One of his famous works for the UFW was the poster with a central message of “Support the Farmworkers War” asking for donations of food and clothing. The color palette includes bold colors such as red, black, and yellow and bold lettering with the intention of demanding attention to support the labor movement which is referred to as a war effort. The inverted Aztec eagle (UFW logo) is covering three faceless and barely identifiable figures. In his UFW poster, he represented the farmworker families as advocating for their rights to frame the discourse on the struggle of marginalized communities. Montoya was also linked to the Third World Liberation Front (TWLF) advocacy efforts seeking to establish a separate Third World College that would enhance representation for minorities including African Americans, Chicanos, Asians, and Native Americans. His involvement in the TWLF provided an invaluable perspective on mobilization such as learning about “coalition politics” which conveyed that collaboration between groups with overlapping interests could be a powerful force to enact change. There was an emphasis on the shared struggle which he sought to include in his posters of mobilization. In this wide array of posters, he used the terms “Huelga” (strike) to emphasize the resistance and would use "Unidos" to suggest a form of solidarity between various disenfranchised groups. In addition, his TWLF posters include faceless or unrecognizable figures to suggest that this is a collective fight against power. His time at Berkeley shaped him as an artist as he began to merge politics with aesthetics with the intention of participating in activism at the local and international level.

References

External links

Malaquías Montoya Official Website
Montoya at Galeria de la Raza

1938 births
Living people
Artists from Albuquerque, New Mexico
Artists from California
American artists of Mexican descent
American poster artists
University of California, Berkeley alumni
University of California, Davis faculty
Stanford University faculty
University of Notre Dame faculty